Phu Thok (ภูทอก, also spelled Phu Tok), meaning 'lonely mountain' in the Isan language, is a 359 m high isolated hill in the northeastern end of Isan, Thailand. It is in Na Sabaeng Subdistrict, Si Wilai District, at the centre of Bueng Kan Province.

Geography
Phu Thok is an emblematic sandstone outcrop that is both a local landmark and the symbol of the province of Bueng Kan. It appears in somewhat stylized form in the provincial seal. 

Phu Thok has two peaks, Phu Thok Yai and Phu Thok Noi. Wat Phu Thok, an important Buddhist temple, is in a cave near the top of the smaller peak. 
The summit of this massive rocky hill can be reached via a wooden walkway. The top has views of the surrounding flat countryside.

See also
List of mountains in Thailand
Seals of the provinces of Thailand
Bueng Kan Province

References

External links

Bueng Kan - Tourism Thailand
Wat Phu Tok and surroundings

Geography of Bueng Kan province
Inselbergs of Asia
Mountains of Thailand